Frank Parker may refer to:
Frank Parker (tennis) (1916–1997), American tennis player
Frank Parker (singer) (1903–1999), American singer and television personality
Frank Parker (actor) (1939–2018), American television actor
Frank Parker (United States Army officer) (1872–1947), American military general
Frank W. Parker (1860–1932), New Mexico Supreme Court justice
Frank Parker (American football) (born 1939), former American football defensive lineman
Frank Parker (sport shooter) (1866–1933), Canadian Olympic shooter, competitor at the 1908 Summer Olympics
Frank B. Parker, a fictional character in the television series Seven Days
Frank Parker (footballer) (1920–2017), Australian rules footballer
Frank R. Parker (1940–1997), American civil rights lawyer and voting rights activist
Frank Critchley Parker (1862–1944), Australian journalist and newspaper publisher

See also
Francis Parker (disambiguation)